The Capital Shakers were a New Zealand netball team based in Wellington that competed in now defunct National Bank Cup competition. The Shakers franchise merged with the Western Flyers to form the Central Pulse in the ANZ Championship

2007 Shakers Squad
 Jamilah Gupwell
 Sala Hide
 Katie King
 Cushla Lichtwark
 Stacey McFeeters
 Ngarama Milner
 Rose Paino
 Lovila Paki
 Daya Pritchard
 Nardia Roselli
 Victoria Smith
 Frances Solia
 Gerardine Solia
 Sacha Coogan
 Jaimee Sorenson
 Kylie Young

Competition history
2007- 7th
2006- 6th
2005- 8th
2004- 7th
2003- 8th
2002- 4th
2001- 4th
2000- 3rd
1999- 7th
1998- 8th

External links
Capital Shakers
The National Bank netball website
Netball New Zealand NBC page

Sport in Wellington City
Sports clubs established in 1998
1998 establishments in New Zealand
Central Pulse
Defunct netball teams in New Zealand
National Bank Cup teams